Hájek (i.e. "small grove") may refer to Czech surname or places:

Surname
Its feminine equivalent is Hájková. The surname may refer to:
 Alena Hájková (1924-2012), Czech Communist resistance fighter, Righteous among the Nations and historian
 Andreas Hajek (born 1968), German rower
 Anne Hajek (born 1951), American politician
 Anna Hájková (born 1978), Czech historian
 Antonín Hájek (born 1987), Czech ski jumper
 Arnošt Hájek (b. 1941), Czech biathlete
 Bohumil Hájek, Czech table tennis player
 Bruce Hajek, American electrical engineer
 Dave Hajek (born 1967), American baseball player
 David Hájek (born 1980), Czech ice hockey player
 Emil Hájek (1886–1974), Czech pianist and composer
 František Hájek (1915-2001), Czech basketball player
 Gwen Hajek (born 1966), American model
 Heinz Hajek-Halke (1898–1983) German photographer
 Jan Hajek (scientist), Czech scientist
 Jan Hájek (tennis) (born 1983), Czech tennis player
 Jaroslav Hájek (1926–1974), Czech mathematician
 Jiří Hájek (1913–1993), Czech politician
 Jiřina Hájková (born 1954), Czech field hockey player
 John Hajek (born 1962), Australian linguist
 Kamila Hájková (born 1987), Czech ice dancer
 Karolina Hájková (b. 1997), Slovak swimmer
 Karel Hájek (1900–1978), Czech photographer
 Libor Hájek (born 1998), Czech ice hockey player
 Markéta Hájková (b. 2000), Czech cyclist
 Miloš Hájek (1921-2016), Czech academic and dissident, Righteous among the Nations
 Olaf Hajek (born 1965), German artist
 Otomar Hájek (1930-2016), Czech mathematician
 Peter Hajek (born 1945), British psychologist
 Petr Hájek (1940-2016), Czech mathematician
 Tadeáš Hájek (1525–1600), Bohemian astronomer
 Thomas Hajek (born 1978), Canadian lacrosse player
 Tomáš Hájek (born 1991), Czech football player
 Wenceslaus Hajek (died 1553), Bohemian historian

Places
1995 Hajek, an asteroid
Hájek (Karlovy Vary District)
Hájek (Strakonice District)

See also
 
Hájek–Le Cam convolution theorem
Hayek

Czech-language surnames